The Forty-first Amendment of the Constitution of India, officially known as The Constitution (Forty-first Amendment) Act, 1976, changed the age of retirement of the Chairman and members of the State Public Service Commissions from 60 to 62 years, by amending article 316(2) of the Constitution.

Text

The relevant amended text of clause (2) of article 316, after the 41st Amendment, is given below:

Proposal and enactment
The Constitution (Forty-first Amendment) Act, 1976 was introduced in the Lok Sabha on 26 August 1976, as the Constitution (Forty-third Amendment) Bill, 1976 (Bill No. 85 of 1976). It was introduced by Om Mehta, then Minister of State in the Ministry of Home Affairs, Department of Personnel and Administrative Reforms and Department of Parliamentary Affairs, and sought to amend article 316 of the Constitution. The full text of the Statement of Objects and Reasons appended to the bill is given below:

The Bill was considered by the Lok Sabha on 30 August 1976 and passed on the same day, with a formal amendment replacing the word "Forty-third"” by the word "Forty-first" in clause 1. The Bill, as passed by the Lok Sabha, was considered and passed by the Rajya Sabha on 1 September 1976. The bill received assent from then President Fakhruddin Ali Ahmed on 7 September 1976, and came into force on the same day. It was notified in The Gazette of India on 9 September 1976.

See also
List of amendments of the Constitution of India

References

41
1976 in India
1976 in law
Indira Gandhi administration